Bryopsidella ostreobiformis is a species of green alga from Croatia.

References
 

Plants described in 1989
Flora of Croatia
Bryopsidales